Credit insurance refers to several kinds of insurance relating to financial credit:

Trade credit insurance, purchased by businesses to insure payment of credit extended by the business 
Payment protection insurance, purchased by consumers to insure payment of credit extended to the consumer 
Credit derivative, financial instrument or technique designed to separate and then transfer the credit risk of an underlying loan 

Types of insurance
Credit